The census of the population in the Kingdom of Bulgaria was held on 31 December 1934.

Ethnic groups 

Number and share of ethnic groups.

Religion 
Number and share of the population by religion.

Sources 

Censuses in Bulgaria
1934 censuses
1934 in Bulgaria